Eding Sport Football Club is a Cameroonian football club based in Lekié. The club achieved steep success as they progressed from the Center Regional league, to Cameroon's Elite 2, right to Cameroon's first division. They became champions of Cameroon in 2016- 2017 season, and qualified for the playoffs of 2018 CAF Champions League but were eliminated at the first round. They had an array of talents including; David Eto'o, Martin Ako Assomo, Jacques Zoua, and Albert Meyong.

References

External links 
Official website

Football clubs in Cameroon
2012 establishments in Cameroon
Sports clubs in Cameroon
Association football clubs established in 2012
Centre Region (Cameroon)